The 1914 Oregon gubernatorial election took place on November 3, 1914 to elect the governor of the U.S. state of Oregon. The election matched Republican James Withycombe against Democratic candidate C. J. Smith.

Results

References

Gubernatorial
1914
Oregon
November 1914 events